Shadi may refer to:Arabic Name Meaning Servant or Seeker of knowledge

People
Shadi (name)

Places
 Juy-ye Shadi, village in Bamyan Province, Afghanistan
 Shadi Township (沙堤乡), Yongding District, Zhangjiajie, Hunan, China
 Shadi, Jiangxi (沙地镇), town in Gan County, Jiangxi, China
 Shadi, Iran, village in Taybad County, Razavi Khorasan Province, Iran
 Chak Shadi, village of Jhelum District in Punjab, Pakistan
 Foshan Shadi Airport, an airport in Foshan, Guangdong, China
 Shadi (沙堤渔港), fishing port of Shangchuan Island in Guangdong, China

Entertainment
 Shadi, a character in the anime and manga series Yu-Gi-Oh!
 "Shadi" (Shady, Chadi), a song from the repertoire of Fairuz